The Internationale Zeitschrift für Psychoanalyse (English: International Journal of Psychoanalysis) was a German-language psychoanalytic journal, which was published from 1913 to 1937 and from 1939 to 1941 by the International Psychoanalytic Association.

Famous papers 
Viktor Tausk's paper "On the Origin of the "Influencing Machine" in Schizophrenia" was first published in the Internationale Zeitschrift für Psychoanalyse in 1919.

Wilhelm Reich's paper "Concerning Specific Forms of Masturbation" was published in the Internationale Zeitschrift für Psychoanalyse in 1922.

See also 
 International Journal of Psychoanalysis, an English-language journal established in 1920.

References

External links
 List of all articles published in Internationale Zeitschrift für Psychoanalyse (in German)

Psychoanalysis journals
Publications established in 1913
Publications disestablished in 1941
German-language journals